AURA may refer to:

 Association of Universities for Research in Astronomy
 Atlas of UTR Regulatory Activity
 AURA (United Artists for African Rap), a collective of hip hop artists
 Automated User-Centered Reasoning and Acquisition System, sponsored by Vulcan Inc.
 DRDO AURA, an unmanned combat air vehicle being developed by India

See also
 Aura (disambiguation)